Backnang is a town in Germany in the Bundesland of Baden-Württemberg, roughly  northeast of Stuttgart. Its population has increased greatly over the past century, from 7,650 in 1900 to 35,761 in 2005.

Backnang was ceded to Württemberg by the Baden (Zähringer family) in 1325. Backnang has been known as Gerberstadt due to several tanneries and leather factories, and wool and cloth mills that dominated Backnang's industries. Today, all of these have vanished, and instead, telecommunication companies such as Ericsson (formerly AEG, Telefunken, ANT Nachrichtentechnik, Bosch and Marconi) and Tesat-Spacecom dominate the town's industries. The Stiftskirche, formerly the church of Backnang Abbey, dates back to the 12th century.

Backnang hosts the annual Strassenfest during the last weekend in June. It has been founded as a street festival where local sports and cultural clubs offered drinks and foods. The traditional opening of the Strassenfest is marked with cannon shots from the city tower at 6 pm on Friday and ends with the Zapfenstreich on the following Monday at 11 pm. The Strassenfest typically attracts more than 100,000 spectators.

Population

Mayors
Before 1930 the title for this position was Stadtschultheiß. In 1930 the title became Bürgermeister (Mayor), and in 1956 with the elevation of Backnang to a "large district town," the title was changed to Oberbürgermeister (Lord Mayor).

 1901–1921: Hermann Eckstein
 1921–1945: Albert Rienhardt
 1946–1966: Walter Baumgärtner
 1966–1986: Martin Dietrich (1929-2012)
 1986–1994: Hannes Rieckhoff (born 1944)
 1994–2002: Jürgen-Heinrich Schmidt (born 1942)
 2002-2021: Frank Nopper (born 1961) 
 since 2021: Maximilian Friedrich (born 1987)

Twin towns – sister cities

Backnang is twinned with:
 Annonay, France
 Bácsalmás, Hungary
 Chelmsford, England, United Kingdom

Notable people
 Eduard Breuninger (1854–1932), entrepreneur, founder of Breuninger company
 Eugen Haefele (1874–1935), Württembergian official
 Anna Ziegler (1882–1942), politician (USPD, SPD), member of the Reichstag
 Friedrich Rösch (1883–1914), missionary and Egyptologist
 Richard Ottmar (1889–1956), theologian and timetable expert
 Ferdinand Schneider (1911–1984), chemist (sugar technology)
  (born 1936), Roman Catholic priest and songwriter
 Dieter Burger (politician) (1938–2007), politician, 1977–1993 Mayor of Sindelfingen
 Volker Hauff (born 1940), politician (SPD), MP, Federal Minister, former Mayor of Frankfurt am Main
 Thomas Freitag (born 1950), actor and cabaret artist
 Thomas Mayer (born 1954), Chief Economist of the Deutsche Bank
 Andreas Brown (born 1964), politician from 1999 to 2006 North Rhine Chairman of Alliance 90 / The Greens in Baden-Württemberg
 Christian Lange (born 1964), politician, member of the German Bundestag and Parliamentary Secretary of the SPD parliament group
 Jens Weidmann (born 1968), president of the Bundesbank, made his Abitur in Backnang
 Gregor Meyle (born 1978), German singer
 Patrick Bauer (born 1992), footballer and playoff winner with Charlton Athletic
 Andreas Hinkel (born 1982), SC Freiburg and Germany footballer
 Ralf Rangnick (born 1958), football manager
 Julian Schieber (born 1989), Hertha Berlin and Germany footballer
 Lisa and Lena (born 2002), social media stars
 Viola Brand (born 1994), artistic cyclist

External links
http://www.backnang.de - Official homepage
http://www.juzebacknang.com
https://web.archive.org/web/20070523190641/http://backnang24.de/murr-regatta/
https://web.archive.org/web/20110719095242/http://www.traumzeit-theater.de/TraumZeit-Theater-KalanagMuseum.htm - Kalanag Museum

References

Towns in Baden-Württemberg
Rems-Murr-Kreis
Württemberg